Aba Jifar Airport , also known as Jimma Airport, is an airport serving Jimma, a city in the Oromia Region of Ethiopia.

Facilities 

Airlines and destinations

References

External links 
 

Airports in Ethiopia
Oromia Region